Joshua Anderson (born May 7, 1994) is a Canadian professional ice hockey right wing currently playing with the Montreal Canadiens of the National Hockey League (NHL).  He was drafted in the fourth round, 95th overall, by the Columbus Blue Jackets in the 2012 NHL Entry Draft. A power forward known for speed and physicality, Anderson became known as "the Powerhorse".

Internationally, Anderson plays for Team Canada, and won a silver medal at the 2022 IIHF World Championship.

Playing career

Early career
Anderson was born in Burlington, Ontario, Canada.

Growing up, Anderson played both baseball and hockey. While eligible for the 2010 Ontario Hockey League Entry Draft, Anderson was passed over by all teams and returned to play midget with the Burlington Eagles. Reflecting back on this day, Anderson stated he expected to be passed over as he was undersized for 16. During the 2010–11 season, he attracted the attention of the London Knights owners who invited him to try out for the team. His tryout was successful enough that he earned a spot on the 2011–12 season roster.

Professional

Columbus Blue Jackets 
Anderson was drafted in the fourth round of the 2012 NHL Entry Draft by the Columbus Blue Jackets. While in his final junior season with the London Knights, Anderson was signed to a three-year entry-level contract with the Blue Jackets. He made his NHL debut on January 16, 2015, against the New York Rangers. During the 2015–16, Anderson underwent surgery to repair a small orbital fracture that had occurred during a preseason game, and was expected to miss up to four weeks to recover. Despite his setback, Anderson scored his first NHL goal on January 9, 2016, against Cam Ward of the Carolina Hurricanes. He was returned to the American Hockey League shortly afterwards where he helped lead the Monsters to the 2016 Calder Cup.

During the 2017–18 season, Anderson injured his knee in a game against the Washington Capitals and was expected to be out for four weeks. The following season was a breakout one for Anderson. He played the entire 82-game season in the NHL and put up a career high 47 points as the Blue Jackets advanced to the second round of the Stanley Cup playoffs for the first time in franchise history.

In the 2019–20 season, Anderson was unable to replicate his offensive game, posting just 1 goal and 4 points in 26 games before suffering a posterior labral tear of his left shoulder against the Ottawa Senators on December 14, 2019. With the injury failing to respond to rehabilitation, Anderson had season-ending shoulder surgery on March 2, 2020, with an expected recovery period of 4–6 months.

Montreal Canadiens 
On October 6, 2020, Anderson was traded to the Montreal Canadiens in exchange for Max Domi and a third-round pick in the 2020 NHL Draft. On October 8, Anderson as a restricted free agent was signed to a seven-year, $38.5 million contract extension with the Canadiens.  He made an immediate impression on arrival in Montreal, and was first dubbed a "powerhorse" by new teammate Tomáš Tatar, a nickname that was soonly widely adopted. Anderson recorded 17 goals and 7 assists during the pandemic-shortened regular season, and was widely regarded as one of the standouts during a tough season for the team. He was noted for his ability to deliver "big game performances". This was reinforced during the 2021 Stanley Cup playoffs, where Anderson recorded five goals over the four rounds of the Canadiens' deep run to the 2021 Stanley Cup Finals. Four of those goals came in two games, the first a two-goal performance in Game 3 of the semi-final series against the Vegas Golden Knights that first gave Montreal the series lead, with Anderson first tying the game in the closing minutes thanks to a misplay by Knights goaltender Marc-André Fleury and then scoring the overtime winner. In Game 4 of the Final against the Tampa Bay Lightning, with the Canadiens facing elimination, Anderson scored the first goal of the game and then won it in overtime, notching the team's one win in the series.

In preparation for the 2021–22 season, Anderson began playing on a line with Jonathan Drouin and former London Knights teammate Christian Dvorak, who had just been traded to the Canadiens. Drouin, who had missed much of the previous season due to anxiety and cited Anderson as a close friend and support through his difficulties, would score the Canadiens' first goal of the season off of Anderson's feed. The Canadiens struggled greatly in the beginning of the season, while Anderson managed a team-leading seven goals (as well as six assists) through the first 24 games of the season before sustaining an upper body injury in a December 3 game against the Colorado Avalanche. It was announced that he would miss between two and four weeks as a result. Anderson ultimately returned to the lineup in mid-January. As the team continued to struggle coach Dominique Ducharme was sacked and replaced with Martin St-Louis, who revamped the lineup and created a new first line with Anderson, Nick Suzuki and Cole Caufield that immediately began producing results. On March 1, 2022, Anderson scored his first career hat trick in an 8–4 loss to the Winnipeg Jets. Anderson later spent some games away from the first line, as St-Louis expressed a desire to revise his style of play to emphasize more than being a "physical guy."

After notching three goals and two assists in the first twelve games of the 2022–23 season, Anderson was suspended for two games for boarding Golden Knights defenceman Alex Pietrangelo.

International play

On December 2, 2013, Anderson and teammate Bo Horvat were invited to partake in Canada's National Junior Team selection camp prior to the 2013 World Junior Ice Hockey Championships. He scored one goal in the course of seven games, where the Canadian team finished fourth.

Following the 2021–22 NHL season, with the Canadiens not qualifying for the playoffs, Anderson accepted an invitation to join Team Canada at the 2022 IIHF World Championship in Tampere. Anderson registered an assist in his tournament debut, Canada's 5–3 victory over Team Germany. In his first nine games, Anderson scored a goal and six assists, including an assist in Team Canada's 6–1 semi-final victory over Team Czechia to reach the championship final. He registered another assist in a 4–3 loss to Team Finland in the final, earning a silver medal.

Career statistics

Regular season and playoffs

International

Awards and honours

References

External links
 

1994 births
Living people
Canadian ice hockey right wingers
Cleveland Monsters players
Columbus Blue Jackets draft picks
Columbus Blue Jackets players
Ice hockey people from Ontario
Lake Erie Monsters players
London Knights players
Montreal Canadiens players
Sportspeople from Burlington, Ontario
Springfield Falcons players